Douglas Knehans (born 1957, St. Louis, Missouri) is an American/Australian composer. He is the Norman Dinerstein Professor of Composition Scholar at the University of Cincinnati College-Conservatory of Music.

Knehans is also the director of Ablaze Records, a company which records and produces music by living composers.

References

External links
Douglas Knehans personal web-site ²
Douglas Knehans page - The Tasmanian Composers Collective ¹

1957 births
American emigrants to Australia
Queens College, City University of New York alumni
Australian academics
Australian male composers
Australian composers
Living people
Yale University alumni
University of Alabama faculty
University of Cincinnati faculty
Pupils of Jacob Druckman
Pupils of Lukas Foss